Asaphodes recta is a moth in the family Geometridae. It is endemic to New Zealand and is found in the southern parts of the South Island. The preferred habitat of this species is open tussock grassland. The adults are on the wing in February and March. Larvae of this species have been reared on species in the genera Ranunculus and Bellis.

Taxonomy 
This species was first described by Alfred Philpott in 1905 using specimens collected from Ida Valley and named Xanthorhoe recta. George Hudson discussed and illustrated this species under that name in 1928. In 1939 Louis Beethoven Prout placed this species in the genus Larentia. This placement was not accepted by New Zealand taxonomists. In 1971 J. S. Dugdale placed this species in the genus Asaphodes. In 1988 Dugdale confirmed this placement. The male holotype specimen, collected at Ida Valley in Otago, is held at the New Zealand Arthropod Collection.

Description 

Philpott described this species as:

Distribution 
This species is endemic to New Zealand. Along with the type locality, specimens had also been collected near Dunedin and Invercargill.

Habitat 
The preferred habitat of this species is open tussock grassland in Otago and Southland.

Behaviour 
The adults of this species are on the wing in February and March.

Hosts 
Larvae of this species have been reared on species in the genera Ranunculus and Bellis.

References 

Moths described in 1905
Moths of New Zealand
Larentiinae
Endemic fauna of New Zealand
Taxa named by Alfred Philpott
Endemic moths of New Zealand